Dorothy Louise Walton, née McKenzie (7 August 1909 – 17 October 1981) was a Canadian badminton player who is the only Canadian ever to win the All England Open Badminton Championships, winning the Women's Singles in 1939.

Born in Swift Current, Saskatchewan, she was a founding member of the Consumers' Association of Canada and was its President from 1950 to 1953.

In 1973, she was made a Member of the Order of Canada, Canada's highest civilian honour. In 1961, she was inducted into Canada's Sports Hall of Fame. In 1966, she was inducted into the Saskatchewan Sports Hall of Fame. In 1971, she was inducted into the Canadian Olympic Hall of Fame.

External links
 Dorothy Walton  at The Canadian Encyclopedia

1909 births
1981 deaths
Canadian female badminton players
Members of the Order of Canada
People from Swift Current
Sportspeople from Saskatchewan